Hallam Benjamen Amos (born 24 September 1994) is a former Welsh rugby union player who played for Cardiff Rugby and Newport Gwent Dragons. He mostly played as a wing, but he was also capable of playing at fullback and as a centre. After eight years with the Dragons, during which time he made 115 appearances, he moved to the Cardiff Blues in 2019.

Amos also represented Wales in international rugby. After playing at under-16 level, he played for the under-20s in the 2013 Six Nations Under 20s Championship, before making his full international debut later that year, against Tonga in the 2013 Autumn internationals. He scored his first international try in Wales' opening game at the 2015 Rugby World Cup, a 54–9 win over Uruguay. He has since gone on to earn a total of 25 international caps, scoring six tries.

In October 2021, Amos announced his retirement from professional rugby union to focus on his medical career.

Playing career

Club rugby 
Amos made his debut for the Newport Gwent Dragons against Wasps in the Anglo-Welsh Cup on 22 October 2011, aged . In doing so, Amos broke the record for the youngest player to play Welsh regional rugby held by Kristian Phillips of the Ospreys. Amos also scored a try on his debut.

On 21 March 2019, Cardiff Blues announced that Amos would be joining the squad for the 2019–20 season. In October 2021, Amos announced that he would be retiring from professional rugby union at the end of the 2021–22 season, at the age of 27, to focus on his medical career.

International career
In January 2013 Amos was selected in the Wales Under 20 squad for the 2013 Under 20 Six Nations Championship, having previously played for Wales Under 16 and Wales Under 18. That summer he played in the Under 20 World Cup, where Wales reached the final.

In November 2013 Amos was called up to the senior Wales squad for the Autumn international series matches. He made his full international debut on the wing versus Tonga on 22 November 2013. Amos was narrowly denied a try by his right foot being in touch.

In September 2015, Amos was selected in the Wales squad for the 2015 Rugby World Cup, where he scored his first international try in Wales' opening game against Uruguay. A week later he played in the victory against England, but a shoulder injury in this match meant he could play no further part in the tournament.

In April 2018, Amos was selected as a member of the Commonwealth Games squad to play in the Gold Coast for the Wales Rugby Sevens team. Amos was involved in the 2019 Six Nations Championship, where Wales won the Grand Slam.

In September 2019, Amos was selected in the Wales squad for the 2019 Rugby World Cup. He played in the bronze medal match against New Zealand, scoring Wales' opening try.

In Wales' victorious campaign in the 2021 Six Nations Championship, Amos started their opening match against Ireland.

Alongside Shane Williams and Gareth Thomas, Amos is one of only three Welshmen to have scored international Test tries against New Zealand, South Africa, Australia and Argentina.

International tries

Personal life
Amos is currently studying medicine at the Cardiff University School of Medicine, following in the footsteps of both his doctor parents and other Welsh international rugby players such as J. P. R. Williams and Jamie Roberts. During his studies at Cardiff, he completed an intercalated degree in neuroscience, in which he achieved First Class Honours.

References

External links 
Dragons profile

1994 births
Living people
Welsh rugby union players
Wales international rugby union players
Dragons RFC players
Bedwas RFC players
Newport RFC players
Cardiff Rugby players
Rugby union wings
Rugby union fullbacks
Rugby union players from Stockport